The MEMS M-52/60 is a submachine gun of Argentine origin manufactured by Miguel Enrique Manzo Sal (MEMS). It is chambered in the 9×19mm round and fed from a 40-round magazine inserted in the forward pistol grip.

Users

EA
FAA
GNA
PFA
PNA
SPF

References

 World Firearms & Ammunition
 Historical Atlas of guns
 MEMS M-52/60 Submachine Gun

9mm Parabellum submachine guns
Submachine guns of Argentina